The Paranui River is a river of the Northland Region of New Zealand's North Island. It flows north from its sources around Paranui to reach the Taipa River  from Taipa.

The dictionary defines a river as a large natural stream. The Paranui is called a stream by the New Zealand Geographic Board, though it hasn't given it an official name, but the 1:50,000 map shows it as a river.

References

External links 
 1912 photo of logs being hauled to coast from Paranui

Rivers of the Northland Region
Rivers of New Zealand